The Zapotecs (Valley Zapotec: Bën za) are an indigenous people of Mexico. The population is concentrated in the southern state of Oaxaca, but Zapotec communities also exist in neighboring states. The present-day population is estimated at approximately 400,000 to 650,000 persons, many of whom are monolingual in one of the native Zapotec languages and dialects. In pre-Columbian times, the Zapotec civilization was one of the highly developed cultures of Mesoamerica, which, among other things, included a system of writing. Many people of Zapotec ancestry have emigrated to the United States over several decades, and they maintain their own social organizations in the Los Angeles and Central Valley areas of California.

Name
The Zapotecs call themselves , which means "The People".

For decades it was believed that the exonym name Zapotec came from the Nahuatl  (singular ), which means "inhabitants of the place of sapote". Recent studies carried out by UNAM indicate that it is actually a hybrid word and should be written Zapochteca or Zaapochteca and comes from “za / zaa” (cloud) and “pochteca” (merchant).

History

Although several theories of the origin of the Zapotec peoples exist, including some possibly influenced in the post-conquest period, scholars largely agree the Zapotecs inhabited the Central Valley of Oaxaca as early as 500–300 BCE, during what is considered the Monte Alban I period. During this period, the Zapotecs established a significant system of governance over the population of the region. The Monte Alban periods, of which five have been categorized, lasted from 500 BCE to the time of conquest in 1521 AD. Yet archaeological evidence from the site of Monte Alban, "the first city in ancient Mesoamerica" has revealed settlement of the region as far back as 1150 BCE. Scholars have been able to correlate with the Formative, Classic, and post-Classic periods of civilization in the region within the greater Mesoamerican history through these discoveries. The Formative stage, from about 500 BCE to 200 AD of which the periods of Monte Alban I and II are attributed to, is characterized by a shift to sedentary settlements and the practice of agriculture for subsistence. From 200 to 900 AD in the Monte Alban III period, the Classic stage witnessed the rise of social and political structures in the Zapotec civilization. This period also saw a surge in religious activity within the state leadership of the society. Later, during the "Militaristic stage" of Monte Alban IV–V from around 900–1521 AD, a rise in military influence common among Mesoamerican societies led states to become mired in warfare and "cults of war".

Culture

Language

The Zapotecan language group is composed of over 60 variants of Zapotecan, as well as the closely related Chatino language. The major variant is Isthmus Zapotec, which is spoken on the Pacific coastal plain of Southern Oaxaca's Isthmus of Tehuantepec.

Religion
Though the Zapotecs are now largely Catholics, some of their ancient beliefs and practices, such as the burial of the dead with valuables, still survive. Some images of local Catholic saints resemble the old gods of the Zapotecs. One example is of San Pedro who resembles the Zapotec rain god Cocijo. The first missionaries among the Zapotecs were Bartolomé de Olmeda, a Mercedarian, and Juan Díaz, a secular priest, who was killed by the natives in Quechula near Tepeaca for having "overthrown their idols". 

Notably, while the Virgen de Guadalupe is a notable Catholic figure in most of Mexico and Latin America, the Virgen de Juquila is a Catholic Marian devotion founded in the town of Santa Catarina Juquila, in the Mexican state of Oaxaca. Many Zapotec Catholic people participate in an annual pilgrimage to visit the statue during festivities lasting from December 7 to December 9. 

At the time of the Spanish conquest of the New World, church and state were not separate in Zapotec society. In fact, the Zapotec lord was trained in religious practice as a requirement prior to taking power. There were large temples built called yo hopèe, the house of the vital force, in which the priests performed religious rites. In the spiritual realm the pè, or life force, lived within various natural elements including wind, breath and was believed to be the spirit, or vital force, of all beings. The priests, known as Copa pitào, who were mostly selected from the nobility, were provided their religious training before taking a position among the religious hierarchy. Commoners were also selected and trained to join the priesthood, but they were only allowed to join the lower ranks. The highest position was held by the ouija-tào, great seer, who was likened to the Pope in the Catholic church by Spanish accounts of the sixteenth century. However, the ouija-tào did not live in Monte Alban, but rather in one of the other urban centers of the Zapotecs in the sub-valley area of Mitla. As a polytheistic religion, the Zapotecs attributed several elements of the natural world to their gods. In the religious practice of the Valley Zapotecs, the primary god was Pitao Cozobi who was associated with maize and agriculture. Other gods include, Cocijo the god of rain and lightning (similar to the Toltec god, Tlaloc); Pitao Cozaana the creator of man, animals and the god of ancestors; Pitao Hichaana the goddess of man and animals as well as children, also considered the Mother goddess; Pitao Pezelao god of the underworld, death, and the earth; Copijcha the Sun god and god of war; Pitao Xicala god of love, dreams, and excess.

Zapotec women

Zapotec women in the Mexican state of Oaxaca play a variety of social roles in their families and communities. As is true for many other cultures, Zapotec women have historically had a different place in society than men. These roles are in the context of marriage, childbearing, and work. Within them, they make up a vital part of the fabric that is Zapotec Oaxaca.

Women's autonomy
Much of Zapotec social life is strongly segregated by sex. Men and women often work separately, coming together to eat in the morning and evening, and during ritual occasions, they remain separate except when dancing." The purity of women is highly valued and their sexual and social autonomy can be hindered as a result. "Most women in the community, whether old or young, are concerned with protecting their sexual reputations. Many girls are still strictly watched and not allowed to walk the streets alone after the age of ten or eleven." Though this is seen as a way to protect the women, it ultimately restricts their behavior.
Women are generally free to choose romantic partners; monogamy is valued, but having multiple sexual partners is not. However, for men and women this differs slightly; again for women virginity is regarded as important, even to the extent of publicly displaying the bloody sheet from the wedding night for some, an ancient Mediterranean custom brought by the Spaniards, while unmarried men are encouraged to experiment before they marry. Within marriage, the degree to which women are able to exercise agency depends on the husband. Some women are very free and have the ability to do as they wish, while others may have very controlling husbands; either way, however, women's freedom is determined by their spouse. "While some men jealously guarded their wives (even insisting on driving them to the marketplace), others [allow] their wives and daughters considerable independence." The issue of domestic violence is not necessarily commonplace.

Household function
In addition to playing an important role in the family as wives and daughters, another important role for the Zapotec women is that of the mother. Childbearing and rearing are female duties. It is the women's job to take on the responsibility of the children, while she is also expected to be the one to take care of the household in terms of the cooking, cleaning, et cetera. In addition to all of this, many poor women are also expected to work to help support the family. "Women, therefore, must work to contribute to their family income, in addition to attending to their traditional household tasks of child care and food."

Labor function
In Zapotec Oaxaca, the gendered implications of labor give different tasks to men and women. Because women are also responsible for caring for the children and the home, the outside work they do must revolve around those duties.

"In the past during an agriculturally dominant time, most agricultural activities associated with planting and harvesting are carried out directly by men, women also participate in the agricultural production. In particular, female household workers help with weeding and harvesting. Seldom is a female seen planting or plowing. When no male labor is available, however, women also work in planting. The majority of female labor was directed toward supplying male workers with food during agricultural activities and providing supplemental labor during weeding and harvesting."

However, with the onset of globalized industry and Mexico's transition from an agricultural economy to one revolving around services and manufacturing, the ideas about women and work have been shifting dramatically. Women now see a way that they can participate in the market economy to make extra money for their families, and still are able to maintain the additional work they do at home which has no monetary value. As men are migrating for other, mostly industrial, work opportunities and agrarian work is decreasing, women have come to dominate the textile industry, which caters mainly to tourists. Weaving and factory life has become a way of life for many Zapotec women in Oaxaca.

"Clothing is a relatively new industry which began about 1960. Sewing on treadle-type sewing machines has been practiced in [areas of Oaxaca] since about 1940, when they were brought into the area by the Singer Company. Shortly after that, women who since pre-Columbian times had contributed to the subsistence of their families by weaving, began to make and design men's ready-made shirts and trousers for sale in the local market and the global markets."

The industry has had a significant impact on the wage-earning opportunity of Zapotec women. Workers in Teotitlan's textile industry employ a variety of strategies and systems of production [from] piecework production...increased direct control over production and distribution...weaving cooperatives...establishment of households and small businesses in Oaxaca... [to] subcontracting of weaving in Teotitlan and surrounding communities."

As women are increasingly working and involved in the market because of their contribution to the industry, the role they have in society is changing in relation to other aspects of their lives.

"While women in the community have common social roles based on their gendered positions as wives, mothers, and daughters, these roles are modified by the position of their household as workers or merchants. In their discussions of differences among themselves, women particularly emphasized merchant or worker status, specifically in the role of each in local labor relations."

The merchant has come to symbolize a higher class status than the worker because they are the individuals who essentially control the market.
For Zapotec communities, occupations are divided by gender. While men have a place in the industry as overseers, it is still primarily considered to be 'women's work'. Furthermore, even though the manufacturing industry has been thriving on a global scale, because of the gender separation of labor, there is a lower value placed on the work. Local industry is not seen as a glorious business in the Zapotec community because it is essentially controlled by women.

"In general, the women [in Zapotec communities] are considered productively inferior to men. Their ability to contribute to the economy and family are respected but, they are believed to be less capable than men as managers and their work is looked upon as insignificant. In consequence Yaletecos do not see the manufacturing industry as an industry. Although shirt making like other women's work is visible in itself, it is not an industry, but is perceived as part of the category of women's work comprising weaving, sewing, and embroidery. In contrast, men's occupations are identifiable, and a man is known by the type of work he performs."

Teotiteco industrial exports, such as textiles, clothing and manufactured goods such as electronics and white goods, are being absorbed into the U.S. consumer market and shifting the local economy of Oaxaca from a small community of workers and merchants and blending them into the global marketplace. The women are producing goods which are being bought and sold not only in Mexico, but also in the United States and the rest of the world.

In the central valleys of Oaxaca, the Zapotec villages often have a specific craft associated with them. In those villages, most of the people of that village will be makers of that particular product. In San Bartolo Coyotepec, they are known for their black pottery. San Martín Tilcajete people are known for their carved and brightly painted wooden figures.

Although there are very specifically defined gender roles regarding industrial production, it varies by city and by technique. In larger cities, such as Oaxaca, where the industry is based around more expensive goods, such as automotive production or electronics manufacturing, men typically command factories and are engineers and directors, while women are usually in the lower positions of line workers and assistants. In villages such as San Bartolo Yautepec, where back-strap weaving is done, the weaving is done by women. These are usually lightweight fabrics used for table runners, purses and smaller items. In Teotitlán, Santa Ana del Valle and Villa Díaz Ordaz for example, rug weaving on floor looms is done primarily by men, though women also weave rugs. Women's contributions are becoming greater and many women have a certain degree of independence and autonomy through their income from weaving. But feeding, clothing and taking care of the family is usually their primary responsibility. In Mitla, fly shuttle weaving, of light-weight, but large-scale, fabrics are also more often done by men than by women, probably because of the physical effort required.

Notable Zapotecs in History
Benito Juarez: Born in Oaxaca to Zapotec parents, Benito Juarez was a liberal politician and leader of La Reforma (The Reform) in Mexico.  He was the first president of Mexico of indigenous origin
Jessica Hernandez : a transnational Indigenous scholar, scientist, and community advocate

See also

Indigenous people of Oaxaca

References

Further reading

External links
 Zapotec Culture (in English and Spanish)
 Zapotec Language (including variants, in English and Spanish)
 https://www.facebook.com/organizacionsantiagomatatlan